Walter Schneider (born 22 August 1953) is an Austrian ice hockey player. He competed in the men's tournament at the 1976 Winter Olympics.

References

1953 births
Living people
Austrian ice hockey players
Olympic ice hockey players of Austria
Ice hockey players at the 1976 Winter Olympics
Ice hockey people from Vienna